Rizarios (or Rizareios) Ecclesiastical School of Athens (Greek: Ριζάρειος Εκκλησιαστική Σχολή Αθηνών ή Ριζάρειος Σχολή) is a Greek Orthodox educational institution founded at 1841, by Manthos and Georgios Rizaris, who was members of the Society of Friends (Filiki Eteria).

Notable people and graduates 

 Xenophon Zolotas
 Nectarios of Aegina
 Georgios Gennadios
 Neophytos Doukas
 Eleftherios Stavridis
 Theodore II of Alexandria 
 Chrysostomos I of Athens
 Ieronymos I of Athens
 Archbishop Makarios of Australia
 Metropolitan Theophylactos of Australia
 Serafim Papakostas
 Stefan Ramniceanu
 Gregorios Papamichael
 Visarion Xhuvani
 Anastasios Tagis
 Theodoros Papagiannis
 Ioannis Theodorakopoulos
 Patroklos Karantinos

References 

19th-century establishments in Greece
Educational institutions established in 1841
Modern Greek Enlightenment
Schools in Greece
Eastern Orthodox schools
Schools in Athens